The Deutsches Frauenwerk was a Nazi Association for women, which was created in October 1933.

See also 
 League of German Girls
 Cross of Honour of the German Mother
 Women in Nazi Germany

References 
Stefan Schnurr: Sozialpädagogen im Nationalsozialismus. Eine Fallstudie zur sozialpädagogischen Bewegung im Übergang zum NS-Staat. Juventa, Weinheim 1997 
Frauengruppe Faschismusforschung: Mutterkreuz und Arbeitsbuch. Zur Geschichte der Frauen in der Weimarer Republik und im Nationalsozialismus. Fischer TB, Frankfurt 1981, 1988 

1933 establishments in Germany
Nazi Party organizations
Organizations established in 1933
Women's organisations based in Germany
Women in Nazi Germany